Acrocercops phaeodeta is a moth of the family Gracillariidae, known from Samoa. It was described by Edward Meyrick in 1927.

References

phaeodeta
Moths of Oceania
Moths described in 1927